Francisco José Perdomo Borges (born 18 February 1994), commonly known as Nili, is a Spanish professional footballer. He plays mainly as a right back, but he can also play as a midfielder or a winger for Greek Super League 2 club Kallithea.

Career
Born in Las Palmas, Canary Islands, Nili graduated with UD Las Palmas's youth setup, and made his senior debuts with the C-team in 2012. In the following year, he was promoted to the reserves of the Segunda División B.

On 19 December 2014, Nili renewed his link until 2016. He made his first-team debut on 7 June, starting in a 3–2 home win against Deportivo Alavés in the Segunda División.

Nili made his La Liga debut on 14 February 2016, coming on as a late substitute for David García in a 0–2 away loss against Sevilla FC. On 1 July of that year, he signed for FC Barcelona B after his contract expired.

Nili made his first team debut for Barça on 30 November 2016, replacing Samuel Umtiti in a 1–1 away draw against Hércules CF, in the season's Copa del Rey. The following 1 September, however, he cut ties with the club and immediately signed a two-year contract with Albacete Balompié.

On 24 January 2018, Nili moved abroad for the first time in his career after signing for Platanias in the Superleague Greece.

On 28 January 2020, Nili joined Indian club Bengaluru FC as a replacement for Manuel Onwu. 

On 9 June 2020, he signed a two-year contract with AEL.

Career statistics
As of 30 November 2016.

Honours
Levadiakos
Super League 2: 2021–22

References

External links

1994 births
Living people
Footballers from Las Palmas
Spanish footballers
Association football defenders
Association football wingers
La Liga players
Segunda División players
Segunda División B players
UD Las Palmas Atlético players
UD Las Palmas players
FC Barcelona Atlètic players
FC Barcelona players
Albacete Balompié players
Platanias F.C. players
Spanish expatriate footballers
Spanish expatriate sportspeople in Greece
Expatriate footballers in Greece
Expatriate footballers in India
Spanish expatriate sportspeople in India
Indian Super League players
Bengaluru FC players
Levadiakos F.C. players